Loyal Legion may refer to:

 The Military Order of the Loyal Legion of the United States, a fraternity composed of former Union Army officers from the American Civil War (and, later, of their descendants)
 The Loyal Legion of Loggers and Lumbermen (LLLL), formed by the U.S. War Department during World War I as a counter to the Industrial Workers of the World (IWW)